Felicia Arlene O'Dell (May 7, 1957 – March 18, 2017), popularly known as Auntie Fee, was an American YouTube personality and online cooking show star, whose videos were recorded in her kitchen by her son, Tavis Hunter. She made various television appearances throughout her career, and became known for her comedic-cussing style.

Early and personal life
O'Dell was born in South Los Angeles, one of ten siblings, and her father was James O'Dell, a carpenter, plumber, and electrician. She says she learned how to cook by the age of nine, while preparing some of his favorite dishes, which included gumbo, hog's head cheese, and red beans and rice. But the relationship with her father was a difficult one. When she informed him that she was pregnant, at age 15, their relationship became estranged.

O'Dell attended John C. Fremont High School but dropped out her senior year and developed a drug habit. She was eventually arrested for running drugs out of her home and served time in prison. There are conflicting reports on how long she was in prison. One reports says she was incarcerated just a "few years" in an Arkansas prison. Another source, quoting O'Dell herself, reports that she served 10 years of a 20-year prison sentence. She also claimed to have taken the responsibility for a crime she didn't commit. After she was released from an Arkansas prison in 1992, O'Dell said she remained drug-free for the rest of her life.

YouTube and fame 
O'Dell became an internet video viral sensation in July 2014, showcasing her homemade cooking skills in a series of videos that included "Sink Chicken" and "How to feed Seven people with just $3.35." She was known for making food and saying that it's "for the kids." Her son, Tavis Hunter, served as cameraman and sidekick. She had more than 330,000 followers on her Facebook page.

She made promotional videos for the movies Dumb and Dumber To and Top Five. Among the notable individuals who appeared with her include actress Sherri Shepherd, TMZ founder Harvey Levin and musician Snoop Dogg. Auntie Fee had appeared in various interviews across television, including appearing on Jimmy Kimmel Live!, The Steve Harvey Show and TMZ.

She started a business of selling branded merchandise on her web site, such as dry seasoning, apparel, and other spices for cooking.

She created more than 50 videos on her YouTube channel, titled 'Cooking With Auntie Fee.' She also had roles on the television show Real Husbands of Hollywood and the movie Barbershop 3.

Death
O'Dell reportedly fell sick with chest pains in her home on March 14, 2017, and a 911 call was made. After arriving at the hospital, her son recorded her last moments on camera. While at Harbor-UCLA Medical Center, she suffered a massive heart attack and was eventually placed on life support. Her son, Tavis Hunter, commented on her death, telling E! News in 2017:

Her brother, Jude O'Dell, stated that his sister died at the hospital on March 18, 2017. She was 59 years old. Her funeral, which was live streamed on Facebook and open to the public, was held on April 1, 2017, at Paradise Baptist Church in Los Angeles.

Filmography 
Auntie Fee's filmography references:

Actress 

 2015: Last Call
 2016: Bank 
 2016: Barbershop: The Next Cut
 2017: The Fighters Prayer
 2017: Hogan

See also 
 List of YouTubers

References

External links 
 
 

1957 births
2017 deaths
People from Los Angeles
American women chefs
American YouTubers
American chefs
John C. Fremont High School alumni
21st-century American women